Blue anemone is a common name for closely related species of plants:

In Europe: Anemonoides apennina
In North America: Anemonoides oregana
In Mediterranean Basin: Anemone coronaria

Anemonoides